The bradykinin receptor family is a group of G-protein coupled receptors whose principal ligand is the protein bradykinin.

There are two Bradykinin receptors: the B1 receptor and the B2 receptor.

B1 receptor

Bradykinin receptor B1 (B1) is a G-protein coupled receptor encoded by the BDKRB1 gene in humans. Its principal ligand is bradykinin, a 9 amino acid peptide generated in pathophysiologic conditions such as inflammation, trauma, burns, shock, and allergy. The B1 receptor is one of two G protein-coupled receptors that have been found which bind bradykinin and mediate responses to these pathophysiologic conditions.

B1 protein is synthesized by de novo following tissue injury and receptor binding leads to an increase in the cytosolic calcium ion concentration, ultimately resulting in chronic and acute inflammatory responses.

B2 receptor

The B2 receptor is a G protein-coupled receptor, coupled to Gq and Gi. Gq stimulates phospholipase C to increase intracellular free calcium and Gi inhibits adenylate cyclase. Furthermore, the receptor stimulates the mitogen-activated protein kinase pathways. It is ubiquitously and constitutively expressed in healthy tissues.

The B2 receptor forms a complex with angiotensin converting enzyme (ACE), and this is thought to play a role in cross-talk between the renin-angiotensin system (RAS) and the kinin–kallikrein system (KKS). The heptapeptide angiotensin (1-7) also potentiates bradykinin action on B2 receptors.

Icatibant is a second generation B2 receptor antagonist which has undergone limited clinical trials in pain and inflammation. FR 173657 is another orally active non-peptide B2 antagonist that has undergone limited trials as analgesic and antiinflammatory drug.

Kallidin also signals through the B2 receptor.

References

External links
 
 

G protein-coupled receptors